Salou Ibrahim (also sometimes known as Ibrahim Salou; born 29 May 1979 in Kumasi) is a Ghanaian footballer currently with Hoboken playing in the Belgian Provincial leagues.

Club career

Early career
Salou started to play for King Faisal Babes, a Ghanaian football club based in the Ashanti city of Kumasi. After two seasons, he was signed by German club TuS Wandsbek 81.

Belgium
In 2000, he signed for FC Turnhout in Belgium, where he stayed for four seasons. During the 2003–04 season, Salou scored 16 goals in 26 appearances for FC Turnhout and began to draw attention from higher-level clubs.

In 2004, he signed for KV Kortrijk, that started his first season in the Belgian Second Division. After one season he went to S.V. Zulte-Waregem in the Belgian First Division and scored nine goals in 29 league appearances (14 goals in all competitions), helping his side capture the 2006 Belgian Cup.

As a result of his play with Zulte-Waregem, Salou received offers from the top two sides in Belgian football RSC Anderlecht and Club Brugge as well as other European sides including AEK Athens and RC Lens. He decided on Club Brugge and joined the club in 2006. On 2 November 2006, Salou scored his clubs lone goal in a 3–1 loss to Premier League club Tottenham in a UEFA Cup match played at White Hart Lane. In two seasons with the club, Salou appeared in 46 Belgian First Division matches scoring five goals. He also helped the club capture the 2006–07 Belgian Cup. There he also stayed for two seasons before returning to Germany.

MSV Duisburg
In 2008, he moved to MSV Duisburg. Prior to joining Duisburg, Salou was close to signing with FC Rapid București. On 8 August 2010, Salou scored eleven minutes into his debut with MSV Duisburg in a DFB-Pokal match against ASV Bergedorf that ended in a 5–1 victory.

Vejle
After only six months in Duisburg, Salou signed with Vejle Boldklub. On 1 March 2009, Salou scored his first goal in the Danish Superliga in a 1–1 draw with AGF Aarhus. During his time at the club Salou appeared in 20 official matches and scored 4 goals.

New York Red Bulls
Salou went on trial for New York Red Bulls in Major League Soccer during March 2010. On 20 March 2010, Salou started and played 67 minutes for Red Bulls in a 3–1 victory against Santos FC, which was the first match played at the new Red Bull Arena. After impressing during his trial spell, Salou was signed on 23 March 2010 by New York Red Bulls. On 24 April 2010, Salou scored his first league goal for New York in a 2–1 victory over Philadelphia Union. On 21 October 2010, Salou started and played a full 90 minutes for Red Bulls in a 2–0 victory over New England Revolution helping his side clinch the regular season Eastern Conference title.

Salou began the 2011 season with New York but was waived on 21 March 2011, two days after the club's first match of the season.

Return to Belgium
Salou returned to Belgium in the beginning of 2012, signing for newly promoted Oud-Heverlee Leuven on 20 January 2012. Although mostly as a substitute, he played in 9 matches for OHL during the second half of the 2011–12 season, but failed to get on the score sheet in the process. At the end of the season, he was released.

Salou signed with La Louvière Centre in July 2012. After one season there, Salou signed with Hoogstraten in July 2013.

In November 2014 Salou signed with Destelbergen.

International career
Salou was born in Ghana, but received his Belgian nationality in 2005. Following a successful campaign with S.V. Zulte-Waregem during the 2005–06 season, Salou started to garner interest from the Belgium national football team. After deciding to represent his native country, in 2006 Salou was called up for Ghana but decided not to join the national side due to a dispute involving obtaining his visa. Coach Claude Le Roy made efforts to persuade him to join the Black Stars, but Salou declined.

Honours

Club
S.V. Zulte-Waregem
 Belgian Cup: 2005–06
Club Brugge
 Belgian Cup: 2006–07

References

External links
 
 Ibrahim Salou at ghanaweb.com
 

1979 births
Living people
Ghanaian footballers
Ghanaian expatriate footballers
Association football midfielders
Footballers from Kumasi
Salou, Ibrahim
Salou, Ibrahim
Salou, Ibrahim
Salou, Ibrahim
Salou, Ibrahim
MSV Duisburg players
Vejle Boldklub players
New York Red Bulls players
Salou, Ibrahim
Salou, Ibrahim
Salou, Ibrahim
Salou, Ibrahim
Salou, Ibrahim
Ghanaian expatriate sportspeople in Germany
Expatriate footballers in Germany
Liga I players
2. Bundesliga players
Major League Soccer players
King Faisal Babes FC players
Expatriate men's footballers in Denmark
Expatriate soccer players in the United States